The 12807 / 12808 Samata Express is a superfast train between Visakhapatnam in Andhra Pradesh and Hazrat Nizamuddin in New Delhi and is operated by South Coast Railways. This train is also known as Vizag Steel Samata Superfast Express and Queen of Visakhapatnam city. Earlier the frequency of the train was three days a week but it was extended to five days a week in 2011. With effect from 8 January 2011, the train departs Visakhapatnam on Sunday, Tuesday, Wednesday, Thursday and Saturday. Similarly, with effect from 10 January 2011 the train departs Hazrat Nizamuddin on Monday, Tuesday, Thursday, Friday and Saturday. The average speed of the train is 60 km per hour. Samata in Sanskrit means Equality.

Service
Train No. 12807 leaves Visakhapatnam at mornings and arrives at Hazrat Nizamuddin, the next evening. Vice versa the return journey follows the same pattern. This train takes about 34 hours to reach from its source to destination.

Route & Halts
 Visakhapatnam Junction
 Simhachalam
 Vizianagaram Junction
 Parvathipuram
 Parvatipuram Town
 Rayagada
 Titlagarh
 Kesinga
 Kantabanji
 Harishanker
 Khariar Road
 Bagbahara
 Mahasamund
 Raipur Junction
 Durg Junction
 Rajnandgaon
 Dongargarh
 Gondia Junction
 Tumsar
 Bhandara
 Nagpur Junction
 Multai
 Betul
 Itarsi
 Bhopal
 Bina
 Lalitpur
 Jhansi
 Gwalior
 Agra Cantt
 Raja ki Mandi
 Mathura
 Faridabad
 Hazrat Nizamuddin

Traction
It is hauled by a Tughlakabad based WAP-7 locomotive on its entire journey.

Rake sharing
The train sharing its rake with 12803/12804 Visakhapatnam Swarna Jayanti Express

Incident
On 6 June 2010, the train had a derailment near Arand railways station in Chhattisgarh, however nobody was injured.

See also

 Visakhapatnam Swarna Jayanti Express

References

External links

Transport in Visakhapatnam
Transport in Delhi
Railway services introduced in 1997
Named passenger trains of India
Express trains in India
Rail transport in Uttar Pradesh
Rail transport in Madhya Pradesh
Rail transport in Andhra Pradesh
Rail transport in Telangana
Rail transport in Delhi
Rail transport in Maharashtra
Rail transport in Odisha